Nafferton railway station serves the village of Nafferton in the East Riding of Yorkshire, England. It is located on the Yorkshire Coast Line and is operated by Northern that provides all passenger train services. In 1985, the station and the adjoining station master's house were given Grade II listed building status.

Facilities

It is unstaffed and has no ticket machine, so tickets must be bought in advance or on the train. There are waiting shelters and timetable information posters on each platform.  Step-free access is available to both, via the automatic level crossing if travelling south.

Services

The station has a similar service level to that at neighbouring Hutton Cranswick: hourly trains on weekdays to Hull and Bridlington, with additional calls at peak periods. On Sundays, there is an hourly service in each direction to Sheffield and Scarborough since the summer 2019 timetable change.

References

 Fawcett, Bill (2001) A History of North Eastern Railway Architecture. Volume 1: The Pioneers. North Eastern Railway Association, .

External links

Railway stations in the East Riding of Yorkshire
DfT Category F2 stations
Railway stations in Great Britain opened in 1846
Northern franchise railway stations
Grade II listed buildings in the East Riding of Yorkshire
Stations on the Hull to Scarborough line
1846 establishments in England
Former York and North Midland Railway stations
George Townsend Andrews railway stations
Grade II listed railway stations